Pretending 2 Run is the sixth studio album by American progressive rock band Tiles. It was released on April 15, 2016, through Laser's Edge.

Track listing

Personnel
All credits taken from the Pretending 2 Run liner notes.

Tiles
Mark Evans – drums and percussion
Jeff Whittle – bass guitar, fretless bass, keyboards, vocals
Chris Herin – electric and acoustic guitars, mandolin, banjo, keyboards, trumpet, vocals
Paul Rarick – lead and backing vocals

Guest musicians
Ian Anderson – flute (Midwinter)
Mike Portnoy – additional drums (Stonewall, Fait Accompli)
 Max Portnoy – additional drums (Fait Accompli)
Adam Holzman (keyboardist) – keyboards 
Mike Stern – lead guitar (Taken by Surprise, The Disappearing Floor)
Colin Edwin – programming & loops (Small Fire Burning, Friend or Foe)
Kim Mitchell – lead guitar (Shelter in Place)
 Kevin Chown – additional bass (Stonewall, Drops of Rain, Friend or Foe, Fait Accompli)

Production
Terry Brown – recording, mixing
Peter J. Moore – mastering

References

2016 albums